The Time Machine is the original motion picture soundtrack of the film of the same name, both released in 2002. It was composed by Klaus Badelt. A promotional edition contains more cues and alternate versions of some cues.

Track listing

Usage in other media
A sample of "Morlocks Attack" was used in the trailer for the 2003 film, The League of Extraordinary Gentlemen.

References

Films scored by Klaus Badelt
2002 soundtrack albums
Science fiction film soundtracks